Wing Commander Hubert Dinwoodie,  (24 March 1896 – 28 August 1968) was an officer in the Royal Air Force and a recipient of the George Cross shortly after the end of the Second World War for defusing bombs in Germany in 1946.

First World War
Dinwoodie was commissioned a second lieutenant (on probation) in the 3rd Battalion of the Dorset Regiment on 8 June 1915, and following training was confirmed in his rank on 14 December. He was seconded to the 1/76th Trench Mortar Battery on 6 April 1916.

During the First World War he won the Military Cross (MC) in May 1916 while attached to the 1/76th Trench Mortar Battery:

Dinwoodie was promoted to the temporary rank of lieutenant on 9 June 1916, and to the acting rank of captain on 15 October. He was appointed an assistant instructor at a trench mortar school on 7 November, with the acting rank of captain, and relinquished his temporary lieutenancy on 8 November. He was promoted to the permanent rank of lieutenant on 1 July 1917.

He became an observer in the RAF on 19 September 1918, joining BEF/20 squadron on 26 September with the rank of second lieutenant (honorary lieutenant). On 6 October he and his pilot were flying Bristol Fighter, serial A2402, when they were shot down; Dinwoodie was badly wounded. He continued in service as a trench mortar instructor, and was transferred to the unemployed list and relinquished his acting rank of captain on 11 June 1919. Dinwoodie was demobilised on 1 April 1920, and left the service retaining the rank of captain.

Second World War
Dinwoodie was commissioned a pilot officer (on probation) in the RAFVR on 28 March 1939. He was confirmed in his rank and promoted to flying officer on 28 August 1939, and was promoted to flight lieutenant (war substantive) on 16 May 1941. As an acting squadron leader, Dinwoodie was appointed an Officer of the Order of the British Empire, Military Division (OBE) in the 1942 Birthday Honours list. He was promoted to temporary squadron leader on 1 January 1943.

George Cross
On 20 August 1946, German high explosive bombs were being loaded onto barges for disposal at sea when a  bomb was dropped and exploded, killing six and injuring 12. Two train loads of bombs were ready for loading and the port area, in the centre of Lübeck, was evacuated. Squadron Leader Dinwoodie (while on attachment to the 5140 (Bomb Disposal) Squadron, Royal Air Force Volunteer Reserve) and Corporal Roland Garred were sent to the scene and defused one of the remaining bombs in the batch to discover that a faulty fuse had caused the accident. They rendered the remaining 11 bombs safe when another explosion would have not only killed them but set off the bomb laden trains and devastated the town centre. Leading Aircraftman John Hatton, the driver in the bomb disposal team, also assisted in moving the bombs.

Awarded the George Cross on 4 February 1947, the citation in the London Gazette praised Dinwoodie for displaying

Garred was awarded the George Medal, while Hatton received the British Empire Medal.

Dinwoodie relinquished his commission in the RAFVR with effect from 10 February 1954, retaining the rank of wing commander. His medals and some photographs are held by the RAF Museum at Hendon, London.

References

External links
 

1896 births
1968 deaths
British recipients of the George Cross
Royal Air Force recipients of the George Cross
Officers of the Order of the British Empire
Military personnel from Bournemouth
Recipients of the Military Cross
Royal Air Force Volunteer Reserve personnel of World War II
Dorset Regiment officers
British Army personnel of World War I
Bomb disposal personnel
Royal Air Force wing commanders